Miss Universe Nepal 2022 is the 3rd annual Miss Universe Nepal beauty pageant, held on 25 August 2022. At the end of the event, Sujita Basnet crowned Sophiya Bhujel as her successor. She is set to represent Nepal in the Miss Universe 2022.

The winner of Miss Universe Nepal 2022 will win NPR Rs. 1,000,000 and other prizes.

Image Channel will broadcast the pageant live and for all the Nepalese abroad. Miss Universe Nepal 2022 will also be live streamed on Youtube.

Background

Location and date
The third edition of the Miss Universe Nepal beauty contest was scheduled to be held on 25 August 2022. The press conference of the contest was conducted at the Hyatt Regency Hotel in Kathmandu. For the first time, the Miss Universe Nepal held workshops in different parts of Nepal. All the Miss Universe Nepal workshops were hosted by the managing director of Miss Universe Nepal Nagma Shrestha, Miss Universe Nepal 2021 Sujita Basnet, fashion stylist Sagar Gurung and Miss Universe Nepal catwalk trainer, Smith Tamang.

Hosts and Performer
Like the last two editions, Subeksha Khadka will host this edition with another co-host that will be announced later.

Selection of Participants
Applications for Miss Universe Nepal started on 4 May and applications ended on 2 July.

Results 

Color keys

(●): The candidate won the Miss People's Choice Award (online voting) and got direct entry into Top 10 Finalists.  <small>
(฿): The candidate won the Social Impact Leader Award (Best BBB (Brave, Bold and Beautiful) Social Advocacy) and got direct entry into Top 10 Finalists.

Special Awards and Sub-contests

Special Awards

The Himalayan Times Brave, Bold & Beautiful (BBB) Challenge 

The Himalayan Times Brave, Bold & Beautiful (BBB) Challenge started on June 20, 2022, where all the contestants had to send their "Brave, Bold & Beautiful (BBB) Challenge" story where they had to submit a video describing an experience in their life that made them "Brave, Bold and Beautiful (BBB)" in the form of a post on either Instagram and Facebook with hashtags relating to the challenge and Miss Universe Nepal so that the organisation can see as well. Submissions ended on July, 6, 2022. The final 3 finalists were judged by Sahana Bajracharya (Miss Nepal Earth 2010 and Miss Asia Pacific Nepal World 2011). The winner of the Brave, Bold & Beautiful (BBB) Challenge was announced on June 8, 2022 where the winner gets automatic entry into the Top 50 quarterfinalists.

MARTINI Best in Swimsuit 

The MARTINI Best in Swimsuit was a subtitle from the preliminary competition on August 22, 2022, where all the contestants competed in swimsuit and cocktail wear for the preliminary competition of Miss Universe Nepal 2022.

Miss Popular Vote 

The winner of the "Miss Popular Vote" was determined via a public paid voting on the Khalti app with the voting page for Miss Universe Nepal or using the Miss Universe Nepal app (NPR Rs. 50 (USD $0.40) for 10 points) and the winner will automatically qualify for the top 10 finalists at the grand final round, held on 25 August in Kathmandu.

Judges
The contestants selected their judges from the Top 10 Q&A round. The contestants selected their judge through the category of which judge they want to talk to. The theme was galaxies, the judges had their selected galaxy for judging (Orion (Orion Nebula), Andromeda, Butterfly (NGC 4567 and NGC 4568), Black Eye, Sculptor and Centaurus (Centaurus A)).

 Thiagarajan Ramasamy (Orion Galaxy (Orion Nebula)) - Senior R&D and Product Innovation Professional
 Anil Keshary Shah (Andromeda Galaxy) - CEO (Chief Executive Officer) of Nabil Bank
 Priyanka Karki (Butterfly Galaxy (NGC 4567 and NGC 4568)) - Nepali actress and Winner of Miss Teen Nepal 2005
 Reecha Sharma (Black Eye Galaxy) - Nepali actress and Top 10 Semifinalist in Miss Nepal 2007
 Sangeeta Thapa (Sculptor Galaxy) - Founder and Director of the Siddhartha Art Gallery in Kathmandu
 Seema Golchha (Centaurus (Centaurus A)) - Ventriloquist and Comedian

Contestants

Top 40 Final Round

The winner who won the BBB (Brave, Bold and Beautiful) Challenge is automatically a quarterfinalist for Miss Universe Nepal 2022.

Top 61 Preliminary

Note

Previous Experience

 (#1) Anuska Adhikari was the 1st Runner Up of [Miss Nepal's SEE Icon 2017]
 (#2) Anuska Adhikari was a Top 18 semifinalist in Miss Universe Nepal 2021 but she later withdrawn.
 (#3) Diksha Khati was a Top 10 finalist and the winner of Miss Talent at an unnamed pageant in 2017. 
 (#4) Diksha Khati competed in Miss Universe Nepal 2021 but she later withdrawn.
 (#5) Aakriti Manandhar was the 2nd Runner Up of Miss Nepal Peace Season 6 / 2019. 
 (#6) Surabhi Kanal was the winner of Miss Nepal USA 2019.
 (#7) Surabhi Kanal competed in Miss Universe Nepal 2020.
 (#8) Surabhi Kanal competed in Miss Universe Nepal 2021 but she later withdrawn.
 (#9) Priyanshu Mahat competed in Miss Universe Nepal 2021.
 (#10) Jasmine Khadka was the winner of Miss Teen Nepal 2016.
 (#11) Shristi Tamang was the winner of Miss SLC Icon 2014.
 (#12) Monalisha Parajuli was the winner of Runway Model 2015.
 (#13) Aayushnova Dhungana Chhetri competed in Miss Nepal 2022.
 (#14) Renuka Chaudhary was the winner of Miss Empress Nepal 2021.
 (#15) Renuka Chaudhary was the 1st runner-up of Miss Empress International 2021 and she also won Miss Talent and Best in National Costume.
 (#16) Sophiya Bhujel was a Top 7 Finalist in Miss Nepal 2019.
 (#17) Sophiya Bhujel was a Top 10 Finalist in Global Asian Model 2019.
 (#18) Sophiya Bhujel was crowned as Nepal's representative for Miss Eco International 2022.
 (#19) Sophiya Bhujel was a Top 21 Semifinalist at Miss Eco International 2022.
 (#20) Rajani Mishra competed in Miss Universe Nepal 2020.
 (#21) Anusha Karki was the winner of NAAT Miss Airhostess International 2021.
 (#22) Ashma KC was a Top 10 Semifinalist in Miss Nepal 2016.

References

External links
Miss Universe Nepal Website

Beauty pageants in Nepal
2022 beauty pageants
2022 in Nepal